Angela Kashuba is the Dean of the University of North Carolina at Chapel Hill Eshelman School of Pharmacy. She is the John A. and Deborah S. McNeill Jr. Distinguished Professor of Pharmacy, Chair of the Division of Pharmacotherapy and Experimental Therapeutics, and Director of the UNC CFAR Clinical Pharmacology and Analytical Chemistry Core.

Education and career
Kashuba received her Bachelors of Pharmacy from University of Toronto and her Doctorate of Pharmacy from University at Buffalo School of Pharmacy and Pharmaceutical Sciences. She next completed residency at Women's College Hospital in Toronto. After her residency, she studied clinical pharmacology at Bassett Healthcare, which is part of Columbia University Medical Center.

The focus of Kashuba's research career has been pharmacology of antiretrovirals for the treatment and prevention of HIV.

Recognition
In 2009, Kashuba received the Leon I. Goldberg Young Investigator Award from the American Society for Pharmacology and Experimental Therapeutics.

Personal life
She has two children and notes the difficulty in work–life balance.

References

Women pharmacologists
University of North Carolina at Chapel Hill faculty
University at Buffalo alumni
University of Toronto alumni
Year of birth missing (living people)
Living people